Professor Susan J. Clark  is an Australian biomedical researcher in epigenetics of development and cancer. She was elected a Fellow of the Australian Academy of Science in 2015, and is a National Health and Medical Research Council (NHMRC) Senior Principal Research Fellow and Research Director and Head of Genomics and  Epigenetics Division at the Garvan Institute of Medical Research.  Clark developed the first method for bisulphite sequencing for DNA methylation analysis and used it to establish that the methylation machinery of mammalian cells is capable of both maintenance and de novo methylation at CpNpG sites and showed is inheritable.  Clark's research has advanced understanding of the role of DNA methylation, non-coding RNA and microRNA in embryogenesis, reprogramming, stem cell development and cancer and has led to the identification of epigenomic biomarkers in cancer.  Clark is a founding member of the International Human Epigenome Consortium (IHEC) and President of the Australian Epigenetics Alliance (AEpiA).

Education and significance of research 
Clark completed her Bachelor of Science (Honours Call 1) degree at the Australian National University, ACT, Australia in 1978, under the supervision of Dr Ken Reed and Dr Lynn Dalgarno (who along with Dr John Shine uncovered the Shine-Dalgarno sequence).  She earned a PhD (1982) in Biochemistry at the University of Adelaide, South Australia, by mapping and sequencing human histone genes, under the supervision of Dr Julian Wells. During her postdoctoral years (1983-1988) at Biotechnology Australia, Clark led studies on the first recombinant vaccine development in Australia and eukaryotic gene expression of human inhibin, IL-3 and GM-CSF.

As Group Leader of the Gene Regulation Unit at the Kanematsu Laboratories, Royal Prince Alfred Hospital from 1992 - 2000, Clark developed highly sensitive techniques that enabled DNA methylation sequencing of single genes from small volumes (<100 cells) using sodium bisulphite, which converts cytosine residues to uracil residues in single-stranded DNA, under conditions that preserve 5-Methylcytosine.

In 2000 Clark established the Epigenetics Group at the Sydney Cancer Centre, Royal Prince Alfred Hospital and led the unit until 2004.  She went on to establish the Epigenetics Research Program in the Cancer Research Division and the moved Garvan Institute of Medical Research and was appointed the inaugural Head of the Genomics and Epigenetics Division in 2015. Clark has published over 650 manuscripts which contributed to the emergence of an entirely new discipline of cancer epigenomics.

Recognition and awards 
2020 – Fellow of the Australian Academy of Health and Medical Sciences
2019 – NSW Premier's Prize for "Excellence in Medical Biological Sciences (Cell and molecular, medical, veterinary and genetics)"
2017 – The Clive and Vera Ramaciotti Foundation: 2017 Medal of Excellence ($50K)
2015 – The Rob Sutherland Make a Difference ($20K), Cancer Institute NSW
2015 – Nadine Watson Lecture Award for a Leading Female Scientist
2012 – Rotary Award for Vocational Excellence
2011 – Victor Chang Medal (Barbara Ell Seminar Series Lecturer)
2010 – Service to Science and Industry, North Shore Times, 50 year medal
2009 – Australia's "Top Ten" (NHMRC) Scientist Award for 2009
2008 – Director's Inaugural Women in Science Lecture Award (WEHI)
2006 – World Technology Award, finalist for 2006 for Biotechnology: the most innovative people in the science and technology world in 2006
2006 – Elected a Fellow of the World Technology Network for Biotechnology for contribution to Epigenetics technology
2004 – The Ruby Payne-Scott Award for women in Australian science
2004 – German Science Prize "Biochemisch Analytik Preis" (50,000 Euros) for outstanding contribution for Methylation analysis. Since 1970, this award has recognized the work of 27 scientists, four of whom have subsequently gone on to win a Nobel Prize
2003 – Julian Wells Medal for "outstanding contribution to gene action and genome structure", Lorne Genome conference

References 

Living people
Epigeneticists
Australian biochemists
Australian medical researchers
Australian National University alumni
University of Adelaide Medical School alumni
Cancer researchers
Year of birth missing (living people)
Australian women scientists
Australian women academics
Fellows of the Australian Academy of Science
Fellows of the Australian Academy of Health and Medical Sciences